New Right is a descriptive term for various right-wing political groups or policies in different countries.

Specific uses of the term include:
European New Right, far-right political movement that emerged in Europe in the 1960s
Nouvelle Droite, a French political movement that started in the late 1960s
Noua Dreaptă, a Romanian political party established in 2000
New Rights Party, a Georgian political party established in 2001
New Right (Netherlands), a political party (2003–2007)
New Right (UK), a think tank established in 2005
New Right (Denmark), a political party established in 2015
New Right (Greece), a political party established in 2016
New Right (Israel), a political party established in 2018
Alt-lite, also known as the New Right

See also
Old Right (disambiguation)
New Left (disambiguation)